Michaniona was a former municipality in the Thessaloniki regional unit, Greece. Since the 2011 local government reform, the town/suburb is part of the municipality of Thermaikos, of which it is a municipal unit. Population 11,901 (2011). The municipal unit has an area of 21.569 km2. The seat of the municipality was in Nea Michaniona. The other communities in the municipal unit are Angelochori and Nea Kerasia.

The town was settled by Greek refugees from the original Michaniona on the Cyzicus peninsula in the Sea of Marmara.

References

Populated places in Thessaloniki (regional unit)